Xío is one of five parishes in Illano, a municipality within the province and autonomous community of Asturias, in northern Spain. It is situated on a slope with a view of the Navia River.

The population is 41.

Villages 
 Xío
 El Alto de Folgueiróu
 Os Canteiros
 As Lleiras
 A Llomba
 As Penas
 El Rebollal
 Os Salgueiros
 El Vao
 Xanxuyán

Parishes in Illano